Novo Airão (or New Airão) is a municipality located in the state of Amazonas in northern Brazil on the Rio Negro River about 180 km upstream of Manaus. Its population was 19,928 (2020) and its area is 37,771 km². The town is reachable both by river and road.

History
The region where New Airão now exists was originally inhabited by Indigenous people, including Waimiri-Atroari, Crichanã, Carabinari and Jauaperi. In 1668, Jesuits founded a settlement at the mouth of the Jaú River named Santo Elias de Jau. This settlement is believed to have been the second or third nucleus of settlement organized by the Portuguese in Amazonian lands. Later, the district around Airão became part of Manaus and when it was dismembered in 1938, became New Airão.

Conservation

The municipality contains part of the Anavilhanas National Park, a  conservation unit that was originally an ecological station created in 1981, as well half of the Jau National Park, declared by UNESCO Natural Heritage of Humanity.
It holds about 24% of the Rio Negro Left Bank Environmental Protection Area, a  sustainable use conservation area created in 1995.
It also contains the  Rio Negro State Park North Section, created in 1995.
To the south of the state park the municipality contains about 60% of the Rio Negro Right Bank Environmental Protection Area, a  sustainable use conservation unit that controls use of an area of Amazon rainforest along the Rio Negro above the junction with the Solimões River.
It also contains about 16% of the Rio Negro Sustainable Development Reserve, a   sustainable use conservation unit created in 2008 in an effort to stop deforestation in the area, which is threatened due to its proximity to Manaus.

Tourism

People go to Novo Airão to access to the surrounding area, including both Anavilhanas and Jau National Parks, native communities and to feed and/or swim with the pink dolphins. The latter facility is offered at a small floating café down at the harbour. It is possible to pay some boatmen at the port for trips to Anavilhanas archipelago,  (the ruins of the old town, and nearby petroglyphs), and perhaps the Jaú River (this one may require permission from the federal environment agency ICMBio). The boatmen should belong to the Associacão de Operadores de Turismo em Novo Airão (ATUNA), and be flying the ATUNA flag on their boat, as well some other companies registered on Brazilian Ministry of Tourism, as they are the only ones allowed to access the National Parks and surrounding areas, to perform nice sightseeing tours for alligator focusing, bird watching, perform aquatic trails, piranha fishing, wildlife observation in general and visit some interesting native communities. It is a good idea to check-in on CAT (Tourist Information Center) at the city's entrance, for a complete list of lodges, hostels and hotels, as well tourism operators, as a starting point to plan your trip.

Because of the current bus and boat schedules, it is difficult to make a day trip to Novo Airão, and one should plan to spend at least a night there. There are good places to stay in the town, of variable quality, from top-lodging to bed and breakfast houses. Usually, those from ANATUR (Novo Airão Tourism Association) offer fine service and infrastructure.

Buses leave from Manaus coach terminal early in the morning and boats from the Port of Manaus in the evening.". It is possible to get there in two and a half hours with a taxi-cab from SINDITAXI. Departures are from Rio Negro bridge, and prices are five reais higher than buses, which takes a six hours journey.

References

External links

Municipalities in Amazonas (Brazilian state)
Populated places on the Rio Negro (Amazon)